Colonel Francis West (1711 – June 28, 1796) was a Virginia planter and at times the Sheriff of King William County in the Colony and Dominion of Virginia and twice represented the same county in the House of Burgesses, the colony's representative assembly.

West was born in King William County, the son of Captain Thomas West and Agnes, both descended from the First Families of Virginia. West was the county Sheriff in 1741. He twice served single terms in the House of Burgesses between 1748–1758. West also served in the Colonial Defense forces during the French and Indian War.

West was married twice. The name of his first wife is unknown. Francis West married his second wife, Jane Cole, after the death of her second husband Stephen Bingham in 1759.

He died in Fairfax County, Virginia.

References 

1711 births
1796 deaths
Virginia colonial people
People from King William County, Virginia
Francis
Virginia sheriffs
House of Burgesses members
People of Virginia in the French and Indian War
18th-century American politicians

de:Bacon's Rebellion